Heroes del Aire (aka Air Heroes, Aguilas de Paz, Heroes of the Sky and Hèreos del Air) is a 1958 Spanish war film directed by Ramón Torrado and written by H.S. Valdés and stars Alfredo Mayo, Lina Rosales, Maria Piazzai and Julio Núñez. The film was released on May 19, 1958, by Arturo González Producciones Cinematográficas. During the postwar years, only 21 Spanish films depicted the combat of the Spanish Civil War, with Heroes del Aire treating the subject obliquely in a series of flashbacks.

Plot
Coronel Rivas (Alfredo Mayo) was a daring pilot in the Spanish Civil War. He marries the sister (Lina Rosales) of a friend (Julio Núñez) in an air force unit. Both had flown for the Nationalist side. During the war, Rivas had stolen a Republican aircraft, but was shot down by his friend.

After surviving the attack, in the 1950s, Rivas eventually becomes the commander of a search and rescue service. When an aircraft from his air rescue squadron crashes during landing, an investigation begins. Complications from a blackmail attempt threaten to involve more than just the commander. In the end, the fear of being exposed for his role in the scandal that could destroy his entire family, leads Rivas to rescue terrified passengers aboard a doomed airliner.

Cast

 Alfredo Mayo as Coronel (en: Colonel) Rivas
 Lina Rosales as wife of Coronel Rivas
 Maria Piazzai as Herminia
 Julio Núñez as Civil War flyer
 Jose Marco as pilot
 Thomas Bianco as Ernesto
 Javier Armet as pilot
 Francisco Bernal as Aznar
 Mario Berriatúa as Guzman
 José Calvo as Capitán
 Xan das Bolas as Percebe
 Carlos Casaravilla as Ibáñez
 Antonio Casas	as Asesor
 Ángel Córdoba	as Teniente
 Félix Dafauce as Médico
 Rafael de la Rosa as Soldado
 Francisco Montalvo as Morales
 Antonio Riquelme as Andaluz
 Rufino Inglés	as Comandante
 Julio Goróstegui as General
 José Sepúlveda as Comandante Rojo
 Vicente Ávila	as Capitán

Production
Heroes del Aire was shot primarily at Barajas Airport in Barajas, Spain, and in Madrid in 1957. The film was one of the few military-themed productions that came out of the General Franco era.

Reception
Heroes del Aire''' was not well received by critics. Reviewer Hal Erickson noted  "Though nothing special, 'Heroes del Aire' was deemed worthy of entry in the 1957 San Sebastián Film Festival." He also observed, "Though Alfredo Mayo is the real star of 'Heroes del Aire', top billing goes to leading lady Lina Rosales."

References
Notes

Citations

Bibliography

 Higginbotham, Virginia. Spanish Film Under Franco. Austin, Texas: University of Texas Press, 1978. .
 Pendo, Stephen. Aviation in the Cinema''. Lanham, Maryland: Scarecrow Press, 1985. .

External links
 
 

1958 films
1950s war drama films
Spanish war drama films
Spanish aviation films
1950s Spanish-language films
1958 drama films